Martijn Kaars (born 5 March 1999) is a Dutch professional footballer who plays as a forward for Eerste Divisie club Helmond Sport.

Club career

Early years
Having previously played for his local team VV Monnickendam, Kaars moved to FC Volendam at the age of eleven. He played for four years in the youth teams of the club, before being scouted by the famed Ajax academy. He progressed through the youth teams, and reached Jong Ajax but did not make an appearance for that team.

Volendam
In June 2018, Kaars returned to Volendam as his contract with Jong Ajax expired. He made his Eerste Divisie debut for Volendam on 17 August 2018 in a game against Den Bosch, as an 80th-minute substitute for Nick Doodeman. He scored his first goal on 25 September 2018 in a 2–1 loss in the KNVB Cup against Willem II. His first league goal followed three days later, as he secured the 2–2 draw in an away match against Helmond Sport after an assist by Teije ten Den.

Helmond Sport
On 7 April 2022, Helmond Sport announced the signing of Kaars on a three-year contract, with him joining the club from the 2022–23 season. He made his competitive debut for the club on the first matchday of the season, playing the full game against NAC Breda which was lost 1–0. His first goal came in the following match against Jong AZ on 12 August, where he made the equaliser as Helmond suffered a 3–1 home defeat at De Braak. On 2 September, Kaars scored a brace in a 3–0 victory against Almere City.

Career statistics

Honours
Jong Volendam
Derde Divisie – Sunday: 2018–19

References

External links
 

1999 births
Living people
People from Monnickendam
Footballers from North Holland
Dutch footballers
Netherlands youth international footballers
Association football forwards
VV Monnickendam players
AFC Ajax players
Jong Ajax players
FC Volendam players
Helmond Sport players
Eerste Divisie players
Derde Divisie players
Tweede Divisie players